The 2018 ASUN men's soccer tournament, the 40th edition of the ASUN Men's Soccer Tournament, determined the ASUN Conference's automatic berth into the 2018 NCAA Division I Men's Soccer Championship. The tournament began on November 2 and concluded on November 10.

Lipscomb entered the tournament as the defending Atlantic Sun Tournament champions, and as the 2018 ASUN regular season champions. Outscoring their opponents 4-1 in the process, Lipscomb successfully defended their ASUN title by winning the championship match against Stetson, 2-0. Lipscomb earned their second ever berth into the NCAA Tournament, where they upset Washington and FIU en route to a Sweet Sixteen run.

Seeds

Bracket

Results

First round

Semifinals

Final

Statistics

Top goalscorers 
3 Goals
  Lewis Scattergood – Stetson 

2 Goals
  Logan Paynter – Lipscomb 

1 Goal

  Alex Dixon – Jacksonville 
  Zarek Jakubowski – Lipscomb 
  Ben Locke – Lipscomb 
  Jose Manzo – Jacksonville 
  Ryan Medilah – Florida Gulf Coast
  Raphael Northoff – Stetson 
  Collin Scott – North Florida

All Tournament Team

References

External links 
 2018 ASUN Men's Soccer Championship
 2018 ASUN Men's Soccer Tournament Bracket

ASUN Men's Soccer Tournament
ASUN Men's Soccer
ASUN Men's Soccer
ASUN Men's Soccer
ASUN Men's Soccer